Leomil may refer to:

Leomil (Almeida), a civil parish in the municipality of Almeida
Leomil (Moimenta da Beira), a civil parish in the municipality of Moimenta da Beira